The Rochester Knighthawks are a lacrosse team based in Rochester, New York playing in the National Lacrosse League (NLL). The 2020 season will be the team's 1st season in the league. The original Knighthawks moved to Halifax to become the Halifax Thunderbirds. Due to the COVID-19 pandemic, the season was suspended on March 12, 2020. On April 8, the league made a further public statement announcing the cancellation of the remaining games of the 2020 season and that they would be exploring options for playoffs once it was safe to resume play.

Regular season

Current standings

Game log

Cancelled games

Roster

Entry Draft
The 2019 NLL Entry Draft took place on September 17, 2019. The Knighthawks made the following selections:

References

Rochester Knighthawks seasons
Rochester Knighthawks
Rochester Knighthawks